Ceratocorema is a genus of moths in the family Sesiidae.

Species
Ceratocorema antiphanopa (Meyrick, 1927)
Ceratocorema cymbalistis (Meyrick, 1926)
Ceratocorema hyalinum Kallies & Arita, 2001
Ceratocorema mesatma (Meyrick, 1926)
Ceratocorema postcristatum Hampson, [1893]
Ceratocorema semihyalinum (Hampson, 1919)
Ceratocorema yoshiyasui Kallies & Arita, 2001

References

Sesiidae
Ditrysia genera